John William Hanna (August 28, 1889 – March 23, 1962) was an Ontario merchant and political figure. He represented Huron—Bruce in the Legislative Assembly of Ontario from 1943 to 1962 as a Progressive Conservative member.

He was born in Wingham, Ontario, the son of John Hanna, and educated there. He took over ownership of the family store; he also operated a car dealership and was involved in horse racing. In 1917, he married Margaret Esther Campbell. Hanna served as mayor of Wingham for a number of years. In 1926, Hanna sold part of the business to Walker Stores Ltd. He died in office in 1962. The Old Hanna Store 258 Josephine Street is now BabyBoom Trading Post which still uses the store and residence.

References 
 Canadian Parliamentary Guide, 1947, GP Normandin

External links 
Member's parliamentary history for the Legislative Assembly of Ontario
Facades of Wingham, Past and Present,  North Huron District Museum

1889 births
1962 deaths
Progressive Conservative Party of Ontario MPPs
Mayors of places in Ontario
People from Wingham, Ontario